Okechukwu Anthony Onyegbule , popularly known as Okey Bakassi (born 3 October 1969)  in Imo state is a Nigerian stand-up comedian and actor. In 2014, he won the "Best Actor in a Leading Role (Igbo)" category at the 2014 edition of the Best of Nollywood Awards for his role in the film Onye Ozi.

See also
List of Nigerian actors
List of Nigerian comedians

References

External links

Living people
20th-century Nigerian male actors
Igbo comedians
Igbo male actors
21st-century Nigerian male actors
Nigerian male comedians
Nigerian male television actors
Nigerian male film actors
1969 births